Iluminada Concepción (born 29 November 1956) is a Cuban former professional tennis player.

Concepción was a doubles bronze medalist at the 1975 Pan American Games. She represented the Cuba Federation Cup team in two doubles rubbers, against Romania in 1991 and the Dominican Republic in 1992.

ITF finals

Singles: 2 (2–0)

Doubles: 4 (3–1)

References

External links
 
 
 

1956 births
Living people
Cuban female tennis players
Pan American Games bronze medalists for Cuba
Pan American Games medalists in tennis
Tennis players at the 1975 Pan American Games
Central American and Caribbean Games medalists in tennis
Central American and Caribbean Games silver medalists for Cuba
Central American and Caribbean Games bronze medalists for Cuba
Tennis players at the 1979 Pan American Games
Medalists at the 1975 Pan American Games